Nafaa Sariak (born 29 November 1994) is an Algerian weightlifter. He represented Algeria at the 2019 African Games held in Rabat, Morocco and he won the bronze medal in the men's 73kg event.

References

External links 
 

Living people
1994 births
Place of birth missing (living people)
Algerian male weightlifters
African Games medalists in weightlifting
African Games bronze medalists for Algeria
Competitors at the 2019 African Games
African Weightlifting Championships medalists
21st-century Algerian people